Mizanur Rahman is a Bangladesh Awami League politician and the former Member of Parliament of Mymensingh-7.

Career
Rahman was elected to parliament from Mymensingh-7 as a Bangladesh Awami League candidate in 1973.

References

Awami League politicians
Living people
1st Jatiya Sangsad members
Year of birth missing (living people)
People from Mymensingh District